Chom Thong may refer to:
 Chom Thong District, Bangkok, a district in Bangkok
 Chom Thong District, Chiang Mai, a district in Chiang Mai Province
 Chom Thong Subdistrict, Bangkok, a subdistrict in Chom Thong District, Bangkok
 Chom Thong (Phitsanulok), a subdistrict in Mueang Phitsanulok District

Districts of Thailand